Aaron Demsky is professor of biblical history at Bar-Ilan University.  He is an epigrapher noted for his work on onomastics.

Demsky is the winner of the 2014 Bialik Prize for his book, Literacy in Ancient Israel.

Books
 Pleasant are Their Names: Jewish Names in the Sephardi Diaspora, University of Maryland Press, 2010 
 These are the names : studies in Jewish onomastics, with Joseph A. Reif, Joseph Tabory. Bar-Ilan University Press, 1997.   (v. 1), 9652262269 (v. 2)
  Yediʻat sefer be-Yiśraʼel ba-ʻet ha-ʻatiḳah, Mosad Byaliḳ, 2012.

References

Epigraphers
Year of birth missing (living people)
Living people
Academic staff of Bar-Ilan University
Historical geographers